Fioretti is an Italian surname. Notable people with the surname include:

 Daniele Fioretti (born 1990), Italian footballer 
 Francesco Fioretti (born 1993), Italian ice dancer
 Robert Fioretti (born 1953), American politician

See also
 Little Flowers of St. Francis (Italian: Fioretti di San Francesco),  florilegium on the life of Saint Francis of Assisi

Italian-language surnames